Splendido Hotel is a double album by jazz guitarist Al Di Meola that was released in 1980.

Track listing
All songs by Al Di Meola unless otherwise noted.

Personnel 
 Al Di Meola – guitars, mandocello, keyboards, drums, percussion, vocals
 Chick Corea – piano
 Pete Cannarozzi – synthesizer
 Philippe Saisse – keyboards, marimba, vocals
 Jan Hammer – Moog solo on "Al Di's Dream Theme"
 Les Paul – guitar on "Spanish Eyes"
 Anthony Jackson – bass guitar
 Tim Landers – bass guitar
 Steve Gadd – drums
 Robbie Gonzalez – drums
 Eddie Colon – percussion
 Mingo Lewis – percussion
 David Campbell – violin
 Carol Shive – viola
 Dennis Karmazyn – cello
 Raymond Kelley – cello
 The Columbus Boychoir

Chart performance

See also
1979 in jazz

References

1980 albums
Al Di Meola albums
Columbia Records albums